Prince Erik, Count of Rosenborg (Erik Frederik Christian Alexander; 8 November 1890 – 10 September 1950) was a Danish prince. He was born in Copenhagen, a son of Prince Valdemar of Denmark and Princess Marie of Orléans.

Early life 

Prince Erik was born on 8 November 1890, in the Yellow Palace, an 18th-century town house at 18 Amaliegade, immediately adjacent to the Amalienborg Palace complex in Copenhagen. He was the third child of Prince Valdemar of Denmark, and his wife Princess Marie of Orléans. His father was a younger son of King Christian IX of Denmark and Louise of Hesse-Kassel, and his mother was the eldest daughter of Prince Robert, Duke of Chartres and Princess Françoise of Orléans. His parents' marriage was said to be a political match.

Marriage and issue
As was then customary in the Danish royal house, Erik renounced his rights to the throne when he chose to take a commoner as wife, marrying in Ottawa, Ontario, on 11 February 1924 Lois Frances Booth (Ottawa, Ontario, 2 August 1897 – Copenhagen, 26 February 1941). His wife was the daughter of John Frederick Booth, who lived in Canada, and the paternal granddaughter of John Rudolphus Booth by his wife, Rosalinda Cook. Prince Erik and his wife divorced in 1937. She later remarried Thorkild Juelsberg, without issue.

The couple had two children:
 Countess Alexandra Dagmar Frances Marie Margrethe of Rosenborg (Arcadia, California, 5 February 1927 – Odense, 5 October 1992), married in Copenhagen on 2 May 1951 to Ivar Emil Vind-Röj (Everdrup, 5 January 1921 – Odense, 11 February 1977), Master of the Royal Hunt, son of Ove Holger Christian Vind, Royal Danish Chamberlain, by his wife, Elsa Mimi Adelaide Marie Oxholm (of Danish nobility),
 Marie-Lovise Frances Elisabeth Vind (b. Hellerup, 7 February 1952), married at Allerup on 7 April 1973 and divorced Christian Count Knuth (b. Stenagegand, 23 November 1942), and had two children:
 Countess Christina Elisabeth Knuth (b. Nykøbing-Falster, Copenhagen, 6 May 1977), married in 2005 to Jacob Conrad Kamman (b. 1979)
 Michael Ivar Count Knuth (b. Nykøbing-Falster, 8 December 1979)
 Erik Ove Carl Johan Emil Vind (b. Hellerup, 5 May 1954), married in Mahé, Seychelles on 15 February 1993 Countess Suzanne Ingrid Jessie Dorthe av Ahlefeldt-Laurvig-Bille (b. Svendborg, 4 March 1967), lady-in-waiting to the Princess Alexandra
 Rosemarie Alexandra Kirsten Vind (b. Copenhagen, 2 November 1993)
 Georg Ivar Emil Vind (b. Copenhagen, 15 October 1995)
 Nonni Margaretha Elsa Vind (b. Odense, 14 June 2003)
 Georg Christian Valdemar Vind (b. Hellerup, 5 August 1958), married in Kuwait on 19 September 1993 to Maria Munk (b. Frederiksberg, 12 October 1966)
 Andreas Ivar Knud Holger Vind (b. Kuwait, 26 November 1994)
 Clara Alexandra Vind (b. 8 January 1998)
 Count Christian Edward Valdemar Jean Frederik Peter of Rosenborg (Bjergbygaard, 16 July 1932 – London, 24 March 1997); married at Stouby on 10 August 1962 Karin Lüttichau (b. Rohden, 12 August 1938), daughter of Folmer Lüttichau by his wife, Ingeborg Carl
 Count Valdemar Erik Flemming Christian of Rosenborg (b. Skovshoved, 9 July 1965), married in Bordeaux on 29 June 1996 Charlotte Cruse (b. Cognac, 23 April 1967), and divorced in 2005
 Count Nicolai Christian Valdemar of Rosenborg (b. Gentofte, 6 November 1997)
 Countess Marie Geraldine Charlotte of Rosenborg (b. Copenhagen, 7 May 1999)
 Countess Marina Isabelle Ingeborg Karin of Rosenborg (b. Skovshoved, 28 March 1971).

Prince Erik died in Copenhagen on 10 September 1950.

Ancestors

References

Citations

Bibliography

External links

 Vind Den nyere slægt (in Danish)

1890 births
1950 deaths
Danish princes
House of Glücksburg (Denmark)
Counts of Rosenborg
Burials at Roskilde Cathedral
Disinherited European royalty
Recipients of the Cross of Honour of the Order of the Dannebrog